Dodge-Hamlin House was designed by Nicolaas van der Arend and built by Clarence Phelps Dodge in 1916, and is located in downtown Colorado Springs, Colorado. It was listed on the National Register of Historic Places in 2014.

The house was used as a private residence from 1916 until 1943, when it was incorporated into the Colorado College campus. It is an example of the Mission Revival architectural style, and is listed due to its historic use in the Colorado College campus, and its use by two significant newspaper publishers and editors in the city: Clarence Phelps Dodge, and Clarence Clark Hamlin.

References 

Houses in El Paso County, Colorado
Houses completed in 1916
1916 establishments in Colorado